Codonanthopsis chiricana is a species of flowering plant in the family Gesneriaceae. This species is native to Panama and mainly grows in wet tropical biomes. Codonanthopsis chiricana was first published in 2013.

References

Gesnerioideae